This article contains information on rugby league played in the UK at semi-professional level in 2008. For general information on the National Leagues, see Rugby League Championships. For other leagues in 2008, see Rugby league in 2008.

National League One

Table

Playoffs 

Week One.
 Halifax (H) beat Widnes (A) (Halifax through to week two, Widnes are eliminated).
 Whitehaven (A) beat Leigh (A) (Whitehaven through to week two, Leigh are eliminated).

Week Two.
 Crusaders (A) beat Salford (H) (Crusaders through to the Grand Final in week four, Salford play in week three).
 Whitehaven (A) beat Halifax (H) (Whitehaven will play Salford in week three's semi final, Halifax are eliminated).

Week Three.
 Salford (H) beat Whitehaven (A) (Salford are through to the Grand Final in week four, Whitehaven are eliminated).

Week 4.
 Salford City Reds 36 - 18 Celtic Crusaders. Match played at neutral venue Halliwell Jones Stadium.

Salford City Reds win promotion to the Super League 2009.

See also 
 Rugby League Championships

External links 
 Rugby Football League

2008 in English rugby league
2008 in Welsh rugby league
Rugby Football League Championship